Qais Ashfaq (born 10 March 1993) is a British professional boxer. As an amateur, Ashfaq competed at the 2016 Summer Olympics as well as winning a silver medal at the 2014 Commonwealth Games.

Amateur career
He won the 2012 and 2014 Amateur Boxing Association British featherweight title, when boxing out of the Meanwood ABC and Burmantofts ABC respectively.

Olympic result
Rio 2016
Round of 32: Defeated by Chatchai-decha Butdee (Thailand) 3–0

European Games result
Baku 2015
Round of 32: Defeated Georgi Gogatishvili (Georgia) 3–0
Round of 16: Defeated Selçuk Eker (Turkey) 2–1
Quarter-finals: Defeated Omar El-Hag (Germany) 3–0
Semi-finals: Defeated by Dzmitry Asanau (Belarus) 3–0

Commonwealth Games result
Glasgow 2014
Round of 16: Defeated Neo Thamahane (Lesotho) 3–0
Quarter-finals: Defeated Joe Ham (Scotland) 3–0
Semi-finals: Defeated Benson Gicharu (Kenya) 3–0
Final: Defeated by Michael Conlan (Northern Ireland) 3–0

Professional career 
He turned professional in July 2017, signing with Hayemaker Ringstar. He will be trained under Ismael Salas alongside Jorge Linares, David Haye, Joe Joyce, and Willy Hutchinson. On 1 February 2018, Ashfaq signed with Eddie Hearn and Matchroom Sport. Ashfaq finally made his professional debut with Jamie Moore and Nigel Travis in his corner on 25 February at the Victoria Warehouse in Manchester against British boxer Brett Fidoe. Prior to the fight, Fidoe had a record of 8 wins and 44 losses, with only 1 stoppage loss against Andrew Selby in 2016. Ashfaq dominated the four round bout winning on points. Referee Mark Lyson scored the fight 40–36 for Ashfaq. Ashfaq had his second bout on the Amir Khan vs. Phil Lo Greco card on 21 April at the Echo Arena in Liverpool. After four rounds, Ashfaq defeated Ricky Starkey via a points decision. Referee Michael Alexander scored the bout for Ashfaq. Ashfaq returned on another Amir Khan undercard, this time at the Arena Birmingham on 8 September 2018. He knocked out Gary Austin in the first round. Ashfaq finished the year fighting at the FlyDSA Arena in Sheffield on 8 December against Jay Carney. Ashfaq stopped Carney in round 5, recording his second stoppage win.

Professional boxing record

References

External links 
 
 
 
 
 

1993 births
Living people
English male boxers
Bantamweight boxers
Commonwealth Games silver medallists for England
Boxers at the 2014 Commonwealth Games
Sportspeople from Leeds
Boxers at the 2015 European Games
European Games bronze medalists for Great Britain
European Games medalists in boxing
British sportspeople of Pakistani descent
Olympic boxers of Great Britain
Boxers at the 2016 Summer Olympics
Commonwealth Games medallists in boxing
People educated at Prince Henry's Grammar School, Otley
Medallists at the 2014 Commonwealth Games